The 2014 United Bowl was the sixth title game of the Indoor Football League (IFL). It was played on June 28, 2014, at the Sioux Falls Arena in Sioux Falls, South Dakota. The top seed in the United Conference, the Sioux Falls Storm, defeated the second seed in the Intense Conference, the Nebraska Danger 63–46.

Road to the United Bowl

2014 Indoor Football League season
United Bowl
United Bowl
Nebraska Danger
Sioux Falls Storm
Sports competitions in South Dakota
United Bowl